Thorsten Streppelhoff (born 15 August 1969 in Dorsten) is a German rower.

References 
 
 

1969 births
Living people
People from Dorsten
Sportspeople from Münster (region)
Olympic rowers of Germany
Rowers at the 1992 Summer Olympics
Rowers at the 1996 Summer Olympics
Olympic silver medalists for Germany
Olympic bronze medalists for Germany
Cambridge University Boat Club rowers
Olympic medalists in rowing
German male rowers
World Rowing Championships medalists for Germany
Medalists at the 1996 Summer Olympics
Medalists at the 1992 Summer Olympics